Nell Hopman and Harry Hopman were the defending champions and second seeds, but they lost in the quarterfinals.

In an all-unseeded final Margaret Wilson and John Bromwich defeated Nancye Wynne and Colin Long 6–3, 6–2, to win the mixed doubles tennis title at the 1938 Australian Championships.

Seeds

  Dorothy Bundy /  Don Budge (quarterfinals)
  Nell Hopman /  Harry Hopman (quarterfinals)
  Thelma Coyne /  Jack Crawford (semifinals)
  Dorothy Workman /  Gene Mako (semifinals)

Draw

Finals

Earlier rounds

Top half

Bottom half

References

External links
   Sources for seedings

1938 in Australian tennis
Mixed Doubles